Hađer is a village in Croatia.

Religion

Roman Catholic Chapel of the Our Lady of Lourdes
Roman Catholic Chapel of the Our Lady of Lourdes was heavily damaged in 1991 during the Croatian War of Independence. Despite requests from local population, as of 2008 it was still not reconstructed.

References

External links

Populated places in Sisak-Moslavina County
Glina, Croatia